Eurymerus eburioides is a species of beetle in the family Cerambycidae, the only species in the genus Eurymerus.

References

Ectenessini